Thorium Energy Alliance (TEA) is a non-governmental, non-profit 501(c)3, educational organization based in the United States, which seeks to promote energy security of the world through the use of thorium as a fuel source. The potential for the use of thorium was studied extensively during the 1950s and 60s, and now worldwide interest is being revived due to limitations and issues concerning safety, economics, use and issues in the availability of other energy sources. TEA advocates thorium based nuclear power in existing reactors and primarily in next generation reactors. TEA promotes many initiatives to educate scientists, engineers, government officials, policymakers and the general public.

Energy crisis and the role of thorium

TEA promotes the use of thorium using a different rationale. Increasing world population, depleting resources and global warming have put severe constraints on the choices of power generation available today. Traditional fossil fuel based energy generation faces two-fold challenges in terms of depleting resources and need to keep greenhouse gas emissions in control. While interim measures like natural gas and unconventional oil are proposed, these still have a carbon footprint and are not universally available. Hydropower use has reached a natural limit in many parts of the world, and the existing capacity is under stress due to climate change. Renewable energy is seen as an important component of future energy generation, but being essentially intermittent, can not be effectively managed by the current power distribution technologies. Hence, nuclear energy is seen as an important option for power generation in many countries.

Present generation nuclear reactors are all uranium based, fueled with either freshly mined uranium or recycled plutonium and uranium as the fissile material. There are concerns about a continued supply of uranium, due to resource depletion, as well as various obstacles to mining uranium deposits. Moreover, the currently widely deployed nuclear reactors harness less than 3% of the energy content of uranium fuel. This technology, in turn, leaves large quantities of radioactive wastes to be disposed of safely. The issue of disposal of these wastes has not been addressed convincingly anywhere in the world. Moreover, a vast majority of the present generation reactors are based on the original design of reactors meant to power submarines, and whose safety is ensured by several active features and standard operating practices. Under various circumstances, these features and procedures were seen to fail, bringing about catastrophic consequences. Highly enriched uranium and separated plutonium are also the feedstock for nuclear weapons.

Thorium has been proposed as a clean, safe, proliferation resistant and sustainable source of energy which additionally is free from most of the issues associated with uranium. The average crustal abundance of thorium is four times more than that of uranium. Thorium is invariably associated with rare-earth elements or rare metals like niobium, tantalum and zirconium. Hence, it can be recovered as a by-product of other mining activities. Already, large quantities of thorium recovered from rare-earth element operations have been stockpiled in many countries. Thorium is fertile material, and essentially all thorium can be used in a nuclear reactor. Thorium is not fissile in itself, absorbs a neutron to transmute into uranium-233, which can fission to produce energy. Therefore, a thorium based fuel cycle produces very little, easily manageable waste compared to uranium. Thorium based fuel cycle options can be used to 'burn' all the presently accumulated nuclear waste. Various thorium based reactor designs are inherently more safe than uranium based reactors.
However nuclear proliferation using thorium has proven to be extremely difficult and non-practical, although proof-of-concepts of the contrary also have been proposed.

Despite all the favorable factors, and use in commercial reactors in the past, interest in thorium diminished in the late 1980s due to various reasons. Critics of thorium claim that the advantages are overstated and it is unlikely to be a useful source of energy. Experts point the adverse economics and the availability of plentiful sources of energy that will deter full commercialization of thorium based energy. These and other issues regarding the use of thorium have been debated.

Advocacy for thorium
One of the stated objectives of TEA is the vigorous advocacy for use of thorium as a nuclear fuel. TEA through its activities reaches out to scientists, engineers, government official, policymakers, and lawmakers to sensitize about the advantages of using thorium as a fuel. TEA has conducted a number of publicity campaigns and social media based outreach activities. TEA has emphasized the research and development done in the USA during the 1950s to 1970s period on thorium based reactor designs and fuel cycle options. Of particular interest was the Molten-Salt Reactor Experiment (MSRE) carried out at Oak Ridge National Laboratory, the United States during 1964–1969.

TEA argues the importance of enabling thorium energy, especially in liquid fluoride thorium reactor (LFTR pronounced lifter), in public hearings, such as the Blue Ribbon Commission on America's Nuclear Future. TEA promotes the establishment of a working thorium powered reactor. TEA is particularly interested in restarting the homogeneous fuels research program and the commercialization of molten salt reactor and the supply chain infrastructure to support it.

Another aim of TEA is supporting the reemergence of a Western Rare Earths Infrastructure by bringing together rare-earth producers leading to the establishment of a consortium for refining rare earths and sequestering thorium for future use. TEA supports changes in existing thorium regulation in the US to promote safe production and stockpiling of thorium as a by-product of associated mineral industries activity.

Activities
TEA proposes to leverage education and training activities by:
creating educational resources and textbooks
providing scholarships
facilitation of expert speakers
producing museum exhibits presenting thorium based energy

TEA plans to engage politicians through round-table discussions and provide them with expert opinion, white papers, executive summaries and talking points to demonstrate thorium technology.

There is a major initiative to engage the public through regular and social media channels. TEA facilitates experts to appear on radio and television and participate in group discussions and provide interviews. In this direction TEA generates a large quantity of its own media including, webcasts, podcasts, videos, pamphlets, books and articles. TEA sponsors advertising campaigns in print, television and targeted mail.

Thorium Energy Alliance has supported a dozen research projects at the Nanotechnology
Lab at University of Missouri St Louis (UMSL), which is located in an Economic Opportunity
Zone.

Thorium Energy Alliance has supported Outreach to youth through stem-based organizations such as
Generation Atomic, North American Young Generation in Nuclear, and Mothers for Nuclear, encouraging young people to get involved in the industry.
 
The Thorium Energy Alliance website has added resources for international organizations and National Labs in the USA as well as industry and Military.The website acts as a resource and an encyclopedia for the history and applications of thorium as well as or repository of all of conference information and related papers and
topical documents.

Thorium Energy Alliance has offered Techno-Economic support for the development of
nuclear medicines, such as Bismuth and Actinium, derived from Thorium extraction
processes.

Thorium Energy Alliance has worked with Rare Earth organizations and the critical minerals institute (CMI) to
solve the critical materials issues in the United States and the Western world by providing
thorium policy guidance with the goal to allow a new domestic Rare Earth Metals industry to start.

In the future, TEA plans to track the milestones in the creation of a thorium economy. One of the proposed methods will be to create a thorium and related technology stock portfolio and a Thorium ETF, which will allow the public to track and participate in the growing value of the thorium economy.

Annual Conferences
TEA organizes regular annual conferences since 2009, where scientific sessions and cross-cutting energy and fuel management discussions bring together a cross-section of interested domain experts. The inaugural conference in 2009 took place in Washington D.C., followed by California (2010), Washington D.C. (2011), and Chicago (2012). The 2013 annual conference was held in Chicago, May 30–31.

The tenth conference, TEAC10, was held at the Pollard Technology Conference Center in Oak Ridge, Tennessee on October 1st, 2019.

The eleventh conference, TEAC11, will be held on October 13 – 15 2022 in ABQ NM , at the national nuclear
energy Museum in Albuquerque. TEA has sponsored the production of a new exhibit on thorium energy and advanced
reactors.   The conference is being put on with participation of the University of New Mexico, Abilene Christian
University Nuclear Department, the nuclear museum, and the support of several of the startups that TEA has assisted with technological support and
policy information.

See also

Alvin M. Weinberg
The Alvin Weinberg Foundation
Nuclear power debate
Thorcon

References

Further reading

External links
Thorium Energy Alliance Website
Thorium fuel cycle – Potential benefits and challenges, International Atomic Energy Agency

Nuclear energy
Thorium
Nuclear fuels
Energy security
Oak Ridge National Laboratory
501(c)(3) organizations
Non-profit organizations based in Illinois